David Shaw (4 March 1952 – 27 December 1989) was an English painter, print-maker and lecturer.

The son of William Shaw by his wife Alice Frid, David Douglas Ernest Shaw was born in Kent, where he lived all his life. He was educated at Canterbury College of Art from 1970–73 and then returned there around 1984 as a lecturer in the Fine Art department and drawing tutor to Graphics Department.

Critical description
In Art & Artists (1982) Edward Lucie-Smith described Shaw's paintings as "Having another dimension – they are not only prose, but poetry.... these pictures are therefore memorable not only for their remarkable technical accomplishment but because they leave such a long and lingering echo in our minds. The clean, powerful draughtsmanship which Shaw brought to these pictures [de Louville's Ebury gallery 1982] provided part of the inspiration for a mixed exhibition of male nudes, as the quality of his work, and also the response it received, suggested that the time had come for a reconsideration of the subject."

Works
Shaw had six works in the exhibition, The Male Nude, A Modern View, at Homeworks, Pimlico Road, in London, which ran from 15 November 1983 until January 1984.

Some of Shaw non-male nude paintings were rescued from The Mill House, Kennington, Ashford prior to the sale of the property in 2012. Untitled (Homage to Eduardo Luigi Paolozzi (1978)) this work is 24” x 24” acrylics on canvas. Another painting “Untitled” which is believed to be the only self-portrait of David Shaw 64” x 44” dated 1978.  Shaw also made an untitled Painting believed to be an abstract portrait of HRH Queen Elizabeth.

His painting, Reflections, Summer (1982), is in the collection of the Arts Council at the Southbank Centre, London.

Shaw Studio sale 
Shaw's studio sale was held at Bonham's, Lots Road, London on 15 December 1994. The whole studio was divided by Bonham's into sixty lots, of oil and acrylic paintings, screenprints and serigraphs. They had been left to the Artists General Benevolent Fund. A short introduction to the catalogue was provided by fellow Kentish painter John Stanton Ward, RA (1917–2007), who began: "I used to see David Shaw bring his pictures to my son's workshop for framing and so came to know both him and his painting. A framer's a good place to meet painters and see their work..."

Group exhibitions
RA 1976, no. 992, Wattle Hurdle, pencil;
Galerie Mathilde, Amsterdam, 1979;
Bede Gallery, Jarrow, 1979;
P.S. Galleries, Dallas, 1981 & 1983;
P.S. Galleries, Maine, 1982;
15 November 1983 - March 1984, six works in  The Male Nude, A modern view, at Homeworks, Pimlico Road, London, organised by Francois de Louville, Mary-Rose Beaumont (chairman), John Russell-Taylor, Dr John George (editor of Art & Artists), Emmanuel Cooper, Edward Lucie-Smith, & Francois de Louville.

Solo exhibitions
Aberbach Fine Art, 17 Savile Row, London, 1977, 1978, 1980;
Ebury Gallery, 89 Ebury Street, London, 1982 L'homme et le Pantin;
Thumb Gallery [Jill George], 20/21 D'Arbaly Street, Soho, London, 1985;
Henley Festival, Pastoral Perspectives 1973-1985; in tandem with works by John Piper;
Line Art Gallery (part of Art Line Magazine), 1-3 Garratt Lane, SW18, Serigraphs, January 1988.

Texts
Francois de Louville and Edward Lucie-Smith, The Male Nude: A Modern View, Phaidon Press, London, 1985. 
Emmanuel Cooper and Nicholas de Jongh, Obituary in The Guardian, 8 January 1990.
Bonham's Lots Road, London. David Shaw studio sale, 15 December 1994. Catalogued by James Ulph.
Jennifer Coates, Gianni Romano, David Shaw, Galleria Astuni, Pietrasanta, Italy, 2005.

Footnotes

External links
 Painting by Shaw in the Arts Council collection. (possibly not him?)

20th-century English painters
English male painters
English contemporary artists
English printmakers
Culture in Kent
1952 births
1989 deaths
People from Canterbury
British pop artists
20th-century British printmakers
20th-century English male artists